John Newcombe was the defending champion but lost in a semifinal to fellow Aussie, John Alexander, who went on to win the final 7–5, 6–2 against Ilie Năstase.

Seeds

  John Newcombe (semifinals)
  Rod Laver (quarterfinals)
  Arthur Ashe (quarterfinals)
  Ken Rosewall (semifinals)
  Ilie Năstase (final)
  Stan Smith (first round)
  Marty Riessen (third round)
  Roscoe Tanner (first round)
  Harold Solomon (third round)
  Raúl Ramírez (first round)
  Cliff Richey (third round)
  John Alexander (champion)
  Jaime Fillol Sr (second round)
  Erik van Dillen (second round)
 Absent
  Cliff Drysdale (third round)

Draw

Finals

Top half

Section 1

Section 2

Bottom half

Section 3

Section 4

References
1975 American Airlines Tennis Games Draw - Men's Singles

Singles